The Cape Metropolitan Stakes, currently named the Sun Met (and previously known as the J&B Met) is a Grade 1 thoroughbred horse race run on the turf at Kenilworth Racecourse in Cape Town, South Africa. It is run over 2000m. It was first run in 1883 as the Metropolitan Mile.

It is considered one of the three main feature races in South Africa, alongside the Vodacom Durban July, and the Summer Cup.

Sponsors

J&B Whiskey (part of the Diageo group at the time) were sponsors of the Cape Metropolitan Stakes from 1977 to 2016. The stake pot offered by the company was R40,000, making it a record purse for a race at the time. The race was commonly referred to as the J&B Met during their rein as sponsors.

In 2017 Sun International became sponsors of the race, with it being referred to as the Sun Met.

World Sports Betting (WSB) a South African sports and live games betting site took over sponsorship in 2022 and the race was renamed to the World Sports Betting Cape Town Met. Press release: https://www.sportingpost.co.za/2021/12/met-gets-a-new-sponsor/

Past winners

Listed below are the past winners of the Met.

References 

Horse racing in South Africa
Horse races in South Africa